Ronald Steven Altbach (December 24, 1946 – February 21, 2023) was an American keyboardist and songwriter who co-founded French-American rock band King Harvest, and played the Wurlitzer electric piano intro on their single "Dancing in the Moonlight" (1973). He later became a session keyboardist for The Beach Boys and penned songs for the group. Altbach was a member of Celebration, a group led by Beach Boys co-founder Mike Love. In 1979, Altbach played keyboards in the band Clean Athletic & Talented (C.A.T.); the band, including John Huff, recorded an album.

Altbach's contributions to the Beach Boys include co-producing M.I.U. Album (1978) and co-writing songs such as "Belles of Paris", "She's Got Rhythm", and "Alone on Christmas Day".

Altbach died on February 21, 2023, at the age of 76.

References

External links
 
 

1946 births
2023 deaths
20th-century pianists
21st-century pianists
Cornell University alumni